Callow is a village and civil parish in Herefordshire, England, about  south of Hereford. The church is dedicated to St Mary.

References

External links

Villages in Herefordshire